Rosa Lula Barnes (August 22, 1868 - 1917) was a grocer, real estate investor, and community leader in the United States.

Biography 
Barnes was born in Huntsville, Alabama and educated at Huntsville Normal and Industrial Institute. Later in life she lived in Savannah, Georgia. She was a leader in the Court of Calanthe and Knights of Pythias social organizations.

She arrived Richard Barnes in 1884. He died in 1911. She died in 1917.

References

1868 births
1917 deaths

People from Huntsville, Alabama
20th-century American businesspeople
American real estate businesspeople
20th-century American businesswomen
African-American businesspeople
People from Savannah, Georgia
20th-century African-American businesspeople
American grocers